Full Throttle, also known as Top Speed, is a one-player racing arcade game developed by Taito in 1987.  It is very similar in style to the Out Run games in that it features a fast, red car hurtling through the US countryside. The key difference in gameplay is the addition of a nitro boost button. The game was released under the title Full Throttle in Japan, Top Speed in North America, and both Full Throttle and Top Speed in Europe.

Trivia

The car featured is a red Mazda RX-7 for right-hand driving countries.
Director Hiroyuki Sakou went on to create Taito's Operation Thunderbolt a year later.
This game was the forerunner of the Taito Z system on which Taito's driving games were based from 1988–91.
Some of the billboards in Full Throttle/Top Speed are plugs for other Taito games such as Operation Wolf and Plump Pop.
One of the billboards in Full Throttle/Top Speed features two detectives who are obvious references to Sonny Crockett and Ricardo Tubbs from Miami Vice. Taito released the similar Chase H.Q. the following year, which also featured Miami Vice-esque detectives.
This game has a copyright notice in the Japanese release. US and World Top Speed releases do not have this screen.

Reception 
In Japan, Game Machine listed Full Throttle on their November 15, 1987 issue as being the second most-successful upright arcade unit of the month.

Clare Edgeley of Computer and Video Games gave Top Speed a positive review, comparing it favorably to Out Run and stating "it must rank amongst the top as a realistic racing game with great graphics and smooth handling." Commodore User, on the other hand, rated Full Throttle five out of ten, calling it a clone of Out Run and comparing it unfavorably to Sega's game.

References

External links

GameFAQs

1987 video games
Arcade video games
Racing video games set in the United States
Romstar games
PlayStation (console) games
X68000 games
Taito arcade games
Video games developed in Japan